Philipp Kohlschreiber and David Škoch were the defending champions, but Škoch chose not to participate, and only Kohlschreiber competed that year.
Kohlschreiber partnered with Christopher Kas, but lost in the quarterfinals to Marc López and Rafael Nadal.

Marc López and Rafael Nadal won in the final 4–6, 6–4, [10–8], against Daniel Nestor and Nenad Zimonjić.

Seeds

Draw

Draw

External links
Main Doubles Draw

Doubles